Kathryn Hulme (January 6, 1900 – August 25, 1981) was an American author and memoirist most noted for her novel The Nun's Story. The book is often misunderstood to be semi-autobiographical.

Writing
Her 1956 book The Nun's Story was a best-selling novel which was made into an award-winning 1959 movie starring Audrey Hepburn and Peter Finch.

Another work, The Undiscovered Country: A Spiritual Adventure published by Little, Brown & Co. was a description of her years as a student of mystic G. I. Gurdjieff and her eventual conversion to Catholicism. Hulme studied with Gurdjieff as part of a group of women known as "The Rope," which included eight members in all: Jane Heap, Elizabeth Gordon, Solita Solano, Margaret Caroline Anderson, Louise Davidson and Alice Rohrer along with Hulme and Gurdjieff.

She is also the author of Wild Place, a description of her experiences as the UNRRA Director of the Polish Displaced Persons camp at Wildflecken, Germany, after World War II.  This work won the Atlantic Non-Fiction Award in 1952.

It was at Wildflecken that Hulme met a Belgian nurse and former nun Marie Louise Habets, who became her lifelong companion. The Nun's Story is a slightly fictionalized biographical account of Habets' life as a nun.

In her 1938 fictionalized autobiography We Lived as Children, Hulme describes a child's perspective of San Francisco after the 1906 earthquake.

Bibliography
Arab Interlude, Macrae Smith Company (Philadelphia), 1930
Desert Night, The Macauley Company (New York), 1932
We lived as children, A.A. Knopf (New York, London), 1938 (LCCN: 38027542, ASIN: B000GBZZIU)
The Wild Place,  (Atlantic Prize for Nonfiction (1952), Brown Little, 1953,
The Nun's Story, Pocket Books, 1958 (ASIN: B000CBFXYA)
The Undiscovered Country: A Spiritual Adventure, Little, Brown & Co. (Boston USA/Toronto CA), 1967; reprinted (Natural Bridge Editions: Lexington MA, 1997)
Look A Lion In the Eye: On Safari Through Africa, Little, Brown & Co. First edition (1974)
Annie's Captain, Little, Brown and Company (Boston,  Toronto), 1961

See also
Margaret Caroline Anderson
Monica Baldwin
G. I. Gurdjieff
Marie Louise Habets
Jane Heap
Solita Solano

References

External links
Kathryn Hulme Papers Digital collection at the Beinecke Rare Book and Manuscript Library at Yale University
Kathryn Hulme Papers, Yale Collection of American Literature, Beinecke Rare Book and Manuscript Library.
"Too Much to Watch," short radio segment from We Lived as Children at California Legacy Project.

20th-century American novelists
20th-century American memoirists
1900 births
1981 deaths
American women novelists
American LGBT writers
Converts to Roman Catholicism
Writers from San Francisco
American women memoirists
20th-century American women writers
Writers from Hawaii
20th-century American LGBT people
Students of George Gurdjieff